Oscilla galilae is a species of sea snail, a marine gastropod mollusk in the family Pyramidellidae, the pyrams and their allies.

Distribution
This species occurs in the following locations:
 Mediterranean Sea

References

  Bogi C., Karhan S.Ü. & Yokes M.B. 2012. Oscilla galilae, a new species of Pyramidellidae (Mollusca, Gastropoda, Heterobranchia) from the Eastern Mediterranean. Iberus 30(2): 1-6 [

External links
 To CLEMAM
 To Encyclopedia of Life
 To World Register of Marine Species

Pyramidellidae
Gastropods described in 2012